Nikola Milenković (born 12 October 1997) is a Serbian professional footballer who plays as a centre-back and right-back for Serie A club Fiorentina and the Serbia national team.

Club career

Partizan

2015–16 season
Passing the youth categories of Partizan, Milenković was loaned to Teleoptik for the 2015–16 season. At the beginning of 2016, he joined the first team of Partizan under coach Ivan Tomić and signed a five-year contract, but also stayed with Teleoptik on dual registration until the end of season. Several days after debut for U19 national team, he made his debut for Partizan in a SuperLiga match against Mladost Lučani played on 10 April 2016. He started in a match against Čukarički in round 32 of the same season and received a red card for a brutal foul on Petar Bojić, which resulted in a suspension for the next four matches. Milenković scored his first senior goal for Partizan in the last fixture of the 2015–16 Serbian SuperLiga, against Vojvodina, which was the hundredth goal of the club for the season.

2016–17 season
Milenković started new season pairing with Cédric Gogoua for the second qualifying round of the 2016–17 UEFA Europa League against Zagłębie Lubin. He also started SuperLiga competition in the first fixture match against OFK Bačka before spending the following two rounds on the bench. After several bad results and some injuries of the players in defense, Milenković started playing continuously from the fourth fixture against Javor Ivanjica onwards. He scored his first season goal in a match against Rad, played on 27 August 2016. He also made his Serbian Cup debut in the first round match, against Napredak Kruševac on 21 September 2016. After Miroslav Vulićević's injury in a cup match against Žarkovo on 25 October 2016, Milenković wore the captain's armbrand. In February 2017, he was listed as one of the 30 best youth footballers in the world by the Italian newspaper La Gazzetta dello Sport. he scored his third goal for Partizan as a senior in 27 fixture match of the season against Voždovac, played on 18 March 2017.

On 27 May, in his last match for Partizan, Milenković scored a header against Partizan's biggest rival Red Star which won the game and clinched Partizan's double of the season, winning both the league and cup competitions.

Fiorentina
On 24 May 2017, Partizan president Milorad Vučelić confirmed that Milenković would be joining Serie A side Fiorentina in the summer. The transfer fee was reported as €5.1 million. Milenković made his debut for Fiorentina in 1–0 away victory over Cagliari on 22 December 2017, having played 84 minutes of the game. During the first few months, Nikola was getting used to his new environment and that's why Viola coach Stefano Pioli didn't often include him in the starting line-up. However, the tragic death of the team captain Davide Astori made Pioli change his mind and include Nikola in the starting eleven more often.

At the start of 2018–19 Serie A season matchday 2,  Milenković scored his first goal at Stadio Artemio Franchi in 6–1 win over ChievoVerona. On 20 April 2019 Milenković scored 6th minute opener in 2–1 away defeat against rivals Juventus.

International career
Milenković was a member of the Serbia under-19 team in early 2016. Later the same year, he was called up to the Serbia U20 national squad by coach Nenad Lalatović, and made his debut for the team in a match against Montenegro. Milenković was called up to the U21 squad by Lalatović in March 2017. He made his first appearance at U21 level on 28 March 2017, in a friendly match against Slovakia.

Milenković made his debut for the senior national team in a friendly 3–0 loss to Qatar on 29 September 2016.
 
In June 2018 Serbian head coach Mladen Krstajić included Milenković in the final 23-man squad for the 2018 World Cup. He played in all three group stage matches. He is widely considered as the best performer in the World Cup 2018 squad, with 34 successful tackles (the most in the group stage), and some great positional play.

In November 2022, he was selected in Serbia's squad for the 2022 FIFA World Cup in Qatar. He played in all three group stage matches, against Brazil, Cameroon, and Switzerland. Serbia finished fourth in the group.

Career statistics

Club

International

Scores and results list Serbia's goal tally first, score column indicates score after each Milenković goal.

Honours
Partizan
 Serbian SuperLiga: 2016–17
 Serbian Cup: 2015–16, 2016–17

References

External links

 Profile at the ACF Fiorentina website 
 Nikola Milenković stats at utakmica.rs 
 
 
 
 
 
 

1997 births
Living people
Footballers from Belgrade
Association football defenders
Serbian footballers
Serbia international footballers
Serbia youth international footballers
Serbia under-21 international footballers
FK Teleoptik players
FK Partizan players
ACF Fiorentina players
Serbian SuperLiga players
Serie A players
Serbian expatriate footballers
Serbian expatriate sportspeople in Italy
Expatriate footballers in Italy
2018 FIFA World Cup players
2022 FIFA World Cup players